The Subprefecture of Butantã is one of 32 subprefectures of the city of São Paulo, Brazil.  It comprises five districts: Butantã, Morumbi, Vila Sônia, Raposo Tavares, and Rio Pequeno. It hosts the main campus of University of São Paulo and the headquarters of São Paulo Futebol Clube, one of the largest teams of the city. The headquarters of Rede Bandeirantes, one of the largest media groups of Brazil, are also in this subprefecture.

References

Subprefectures of São Paulo